The Basketball Tournament 2021 was the eighth edition of The Basketball Tournament (TBT), a 5-on-5, single elimination basketball tournament. The tournament, involving 64 teams, began on July 16 and concluded on August 3 with the championship game in Dayton, Ohio. The format of the tournament returned to that of the 2019 edition—64 teams, each playing in one of four regionals, with the top two teams from each regional progressing to the championship weekend. The tournament was won by Boeheim's Army, who captured the winner-take-all $1 million prize.

Format
For its 2021 edition, The Basketball Tournament (TBT) returned to a 64-team format, with four regionals of 16 teams each (similar in format to the NCAA Division I men's basketball tournament), and each regional being held at a single host site. The regional host sites and teams were revealed by TBT organizers on April 14, 2021. The tournament prize remained at $1 million. The teams and their regional placements were revealed in a selection special hosted by Seth Greenberg and Chris Vosters that aired on TBT's YouTube channel on June 21, 2021.

As with previous years, all tournament games operated with the "Elam Ending", a format of ending the game without use of a game clock. Under the Elam Ending, the clock is turned off at the first dead-ball whistle with under four minutes to play in the game. At that time, a target score, equal to the score of the leading team plus eight, is set, and the first team to reach this target score is declared the winner of the game. Thus, all games end on a made basket (field goal or free throw) and there is no overtime.

The first edition of a "33-Point Contest" was held between the two semifinal games—individual players competed to see who could make 11 three-point field goals the fastest. The contest, and prize of $33,333.33, was won by Omar Strong of team B1 Ballers.

Venues
The Basketball Tournament 2021 featured games in five locations: four regional sites plus one site for the championship weekend (four regional finals, two semifinal contests, and the championship game).

Teams
Key: 

Source:

Tournament bracket
Source:

Wichita Regional

West Virginia Regional

Columbus Regional

Illinois Regional

Semifinals and championship
Television coverage via ESPN.

Semifinals

Championship

Awards

Source:

Notes

References

External links
 
 Boeheims Army vs. Team 23 - Game Highlights via YouTube

The Basketball Tournament
2021–22 in American basketball
July 2021 sports events in the United States
August 2021 sports events in the United States
Basketball in Columbus, Ohio
Basketball competitions in Dayton, Ohio
Basketball competitions in West Virginia
Basketball competitions in Illinois
Basketball competitions in Kansas
Basketball competitions in Ohio
Sports in Charleston, West Virginia
Sports in Peoria, Illinois
Sports competitions in Wichita, Kansas
2021 in sports in Illinois
2021 in sports in Kansas
2021 in sports in Ohio
2021 in sports in West Virginia